Eris (تورکجه: اِریس) or Riss  is one of Tabriz's most popular confections. It is made of pistachio, milk, sugar, vanilla, and butter.  

It is made in variety of flavors and forms. It is also popular with the tourists that visit Tabriz, they usually buy it as a souvenir. It is also exported to other cities of Iran.

It has a very simple recipe, and can be made at home without difficulty.

References

Tabriz cuisine